Karl Wiedergott (born Karl Aloysious Treaton; February 8, 1969) is a German-born American actor. He is noted for his voice work on the sitcom The Simpsons from 1998 to 2010, voicing background characters and some celebrities such as John Travolta and Bill Clinton. Wiedergott provided various voices on more than 200 episodes, his final appearance being in the season 22 episode "Donnie Fatso".

In 2005, Wiedergott decided to take a break from auditioning and concentrate solely on his work for The Simpsons.

Filmography

Film

Television

External links

References 

Living people
German male television actors
German male voice actors
Male actors from Berlin
Place of birth missing (living people)
St. Mark's School (Massachusetts) alumni
American people of German descent
1969 births